Winnifred is a given name.

People 
Notable people with the name include:
 Winnifred Eaton (1875–1954), Canadian author
 Winnifred Harper Cooley (1874–1967), American author and lecturer
 Winnifred Hudson (1905–1996), British-born painter
 Winnifred Quick (1904–2002), one of the last five remaining survivors of the sinking of RMS Titanic on April 15, 1912
 Winnifred Sprague Mason Huck (1882–1936), American journalist and politician from the state of Illinois
Winnifred Sarah Train (1904–1979), New Zealand army nurse, hospital matron, nurses' association leader
Winnifred Teo Suan Lie (1967–-1985), Singaporean student and victim of an unsolved rape-murder case

Places 
 Winnifred, Alberta, hamlet in the Canadian province of Alberta
 Winnifred Street Bridge (also known asWSDOT Bridge No. 1130), concrete box girder bridge in Ruston, Washington

See also
 Winifred (disambiguation)

English feminine given names